Argopatagus planus is a species of sea urchin of the family Macropneustidae. Their armour is covered with spines. It is placed in the genus Argopatagus and lives in the sea. Argopatagus planus was first scientifically described in 1907 by Alexander Emanuel Agassiz and Hubert Lyman Clark, American scientists.

See also 
 Arbacia stellata
 Arbaciella elegans
 Argopatagus vitreus

References 

Spatangoida
Animals described in 1907